Matrix-M adjuvant is a saponin-based adjuvant, which stimulates humoral and cellular immune responses to vaccines. It was patented in 2020 by Novavax. It is composed of nanoparticles from saponins extracted from Quillaja saponaria (soapbark) trees, cholesterol, and phospholipids. It is an immune stimulating complex (ISCOM), which are nanospheres formed when saponin is mixed with two types of fats.

Adjuvants increase the body's immune response to a vaccine by creating higher levels of antibodies. They can either enhance, modulate, and/or prolong the body's immune response, reducing the number of vaccinations needed for immunization.

The Matrix-M adjuvant is used in a number of vaccine candidates, including the malaria vaccine R21/Matrix-M, influenza vaccines, and in the approved Novavax COVID-19 vaccine. In 2021, the R21/Matrix-M vaccine candidate showed a 77% efficacy over a 12-month period. In influenza vaccine candidates, Matrix-M was shown to offer cross-protection against multiple strains of influenza.

Novavax is also testing a combined flu and COVID-19 vaccine candidate with Matrix-M.

References 

Adjuvants
Saponins
Immunostimulants
Triterpene glycosides